Kmetija 2 was the second season of Farm franchise of Slovenia was aired in 2007 by POP TV. 12 contestants compete for a grand prize 50,000 € ten weeks. Špela Močnik, radio host was named the hostess of Kmetija 1. After 10 weeks of the show only allies Daša and Bilijana remained in the game. During live final that happen one week after daily episodes ended Daša won 2 duals and Bilijana won only 1, so Daša become the winner of the farm and 50,000 €.

Contestants

Nominations

External links
Page with all information of Kmetija 1 and 2.

The Farm (franchise)
2007 Slovenian television seasons